Azbukinia is a fungal genus in the class Sordariomycetes. The relationship of this taxon to other taxa within the class is unknown (incertae sedis). This is a monotypic genus, containing the single species Azbukinia ferruginea.

References

Sordariomycetes enigmatic taxa
Monotypic Sordariomycetes genera